St. Philip's Episcopal Church is an historic Episcopal church located at 446 Church Street in  Wrangell, Alaska, United States. Its frame vernacular-style church was built as the People's Church in 1903 by a Presbyterian congregation of Alaskan Natives under the direction of its minister, the Rev. Harry Prosper Corser. In 1905 the Rev. Mr. Corser and many of his congregation were received into the Episcopal Church by the Rt. Rev. Peter Trimble Rowe, the first bishop of the Episcopal Diocese of Alaska. Corser was later ordained an Episcopal priest and served the church which was consecrated at St. Phillip's until he retired in 1934. On May 6, 1987, the church was added to the National Register of Historic Places as Saint Philip's Episcopal Church.

St. Philip's is still an active parish in the Episcopal Diocese of Alaska.  The Rev. Paula Sampson and the Rev. Ian MacKenzie are its co-rectors.

See also

National Register of Historic Places listings in Wrangell, Alaska

References

External links
 St. Philip's Episcopal Church website
 Another website covering St. Philip's Episcopal Church

1905 establishments in Alaska
Buildings and structures in Wrangell, Alaska
Episcopal church buildings in Alaska
Churches on the National Register of Historic Places in Alaska
Christian organizations established in 1905
Buildings and structures on the National Register of Historic Places in Wrangell, Alaska